is a Japanese professional shogi player, ranked 7-dan. He is a former Eiō title holder.

Early life and education
Taichi Takami was born in Yokohama on July 12, 1993.  He learned shogi from his father when he was in kindergarten, and was later accepted into the Japan Shogi Association's apprentice school at the rank of 6-kyū as a protegee of shogi professional  in April 2005.

He was promoted to 1-dan in December 2007 and then to 3-dan in April 2010. He finished the 47th 3-dan League (April 2010September 2010) with a record of 9 wins and 9 losses, and the 48th 3-dan League (October 2010March 2011) with a record of 12 wins and 6 losses before winning the 49th 3-dan League (April 2011September 2011) with a record of 13 wins and 5 losses to obtain full professional status and the rank of 4-dan.

Takami graduated from Rikkyo University in 2017 with a degree in history.

Shogi professional
On May 26, 2018, Takami defeated Kota Kanai to win the 3rd Eiō title 4 games to none. Takami was the first winner of the title since it was upgraded to major title status. As a result of his becoming a major title holder, Takami was promoted to 7-dan the same day.

In May 2019, Takami was unable to defend his Eiō title, losing the 4th Eiō title match to challenger Takuya Nagase 4 games to none.

Promotion history
The promotion history for Takami is as follows:
 6-kyū: April 2005
 3-dan: April 2010
 4-dan: October 1, 2011
 5-dan: May 23, 2014
 6-dan: January 29, 2018
 7-dan: May 26, 2018

Titles and other championships
Takami's has appeared in a major title match twice; he won the 3rd Eiō title in 2018, but was unable to defend his title the following year.

Year-end prize money and game fee ranking
Takami has finished in the "Top 10" of the JSA's  once since turning professional: sixth in 2018 with JPY 26,360,000 in earnings.

References

External links
ShogiHub: Professional Player Info · Takami, Taichi

Japanese shogi players
Living people
Professional shogi players
People from Yokohama
Rikkyo University alumni
Professional shogi players from Kanagawa Prefecture
1993 births
Eiō